Daniel Edwards (born 1965 in La Porte, Indiana) is an American contemporary artist whose pieces address celebrity and popular culture in ways that have often stirred controversy. The release of the pieces is generally accompanied by press releases. He includes the idea of promotion and associative fame in his own marketing of his art.

His works include a sculpture of the disembodied head of Ted Williams, a life-sized statue of Britney Spears giving birth while nude on her hands and knees on a bearskin rug, a bust of Senator Hillary Clinton, and a  bust of Fidel Castro.

Britney Spears

Edwards titled the piece Monument to Pro-Life: The Birth of Sean Preston, explaining that it symbolized Spears' decision to put childbirth ahead of her career. Britney Spears actually had a caesarean section.

In an Associated Press interview, Edwards asserted that he incorporates celebrity stories because:  You're bombarded with these stories. And there's a thread that winds back to the art. That's not a bad thing. People are interested in sex, and it works for art as well.  Edwards conceded, however, that he wouldn't march with either anti-abortion or abortion rights advocates.

A number of the images shown in the media are casts of the sculpture rather than the original. Casts can be distinguished by the joins around the forearms and shins and by their paler color.

Hillary Clinton
In 2006, Edwards created a life-size bust of Senator Hillary Clinton. It is titled Presidential Bust of Hillary Rodham Clinton. The sculpture depicts her wearing a low-cut floral dress.

Suri Cruise
On 28 August 2006, Edwards unveiled a sculpture titled Suri's bronzed baby poop, purported to be the actual first bowel movement of the baby of Tom Cruise and Katie Holmes. The sculpture was to be auctioned on eBay, and Edwards was commissioned to produce a limited-edition plaster replica.  Sources disagreed on whether the bronze sculpture actually contained Suri's excrement: some reported that it did, while others reported the story as being a hoax.

Dead Prince Harry
A sculpture of Prince Harry depicting him dead, in military uniform, his head resting upon a Bible with a locket of his mother's clasped in his hands and with a vulture standing by his feet. Edwards suggests that the sculpture shows how Prince Harry "must have died the day they told him he couldn't serve" (in Iraq).

Oprah Sarcophagus
Edwards created a half-scale model depicting Oprah's Sarcophagus at Gardenfresh Gallery in Chicago at In April 2008. The golden bronze casket lid bears an unclothed full-figure rendering of the media mogul with vertical stripes. Alongside it is the artist's Oprah Burial Mask.

Other works

In 2009, Edwards released String Of Babies depicting mother of eight Nadya Suleman aka Octomom as an octopus embracing the world's only surviving set of octuplets.

On August 9, 2009, Edwards unveiled his latest piece, a nude statue of Angelina Jolie breastfeeding twins, one African and one not.

On August 9, 2011, pictures surfaced of a new statue Edwards had created depicting actress/singer Selena Gomez with her boyfriend singer, Justin Bieber  conjoined by the torso, nude, with only coverings on their private parts. Justin was given the Canadian maple leaf as a covering and Selena, the Texas star.

Edwards also created a "memorial" bust of Amy Winehouse.

Documentary
In 2006, feature filmmaker A.D. Calvo produced a series of short documentaries on Edwards and his work. His compilation was entitled La Danse Macabre: Portrait of a Serial Sculptor.

Sources

Print

Online 
 'Brangelina Sculpture To "Inspire" Future Homeowners'(2009-12-07)  in PerezHilton.com

References

External links
European journal Culturekiosque comments on significance of Edwards' Paris Hilton Autopsy and other sculptures, and his play with celebrity, media, classical mythology and even search engine optimization.

1965 births
Living people
20th-century American sculptors
21st-century American sculptors
21st-century American male artists
American male sculptors
People from La Porte, Indiana
Sculptors from Indiana
20th-century American male artists